Gortroe is a civil parish in the eastern region of County Cork, Ireland. In 1834, the Rathcormac-Gortroe massacre took place in the area during the Tithe War.

References

Civil parishes of County Cork